Cryptandra stellulata is a flowering plant in the family Rhamnaceae and is endemic to the southwest of Western Australia. It is a shrub with spiny branches, narrowly oblong to linear leaves and spike-like clusters of 2 to 12 white, tube-shaped flowers.

Description
The edges of the leaves are curved down or rolled under, usually concealing most of the lower surface that is densely covered with white, star-shaped hairs. The flowers are borne in spike-like clusters of 2 to 12 on densely hairy peduncles. Flowering occurs in August and September.

Taxonomy and naming
Cryptandra stellulata was first formally described in 2007 by Barbara Lynette Rye in the journal Nuytsia from specimens collected in 1997 near Morawa. The specific epithet (stellulata ) means "with little stars", referring to the hairs on the stems.

Distribution
This cryptandra grows on rocky hills between Carnamah and Yandanooka in the Avon Wheatbelt and Swan Coastal Plain bioregions of south-western Western Australia.

Conservation status
Cryptandra stellulata is listed as "Priority Three" by the Government of Western Australia Department of Biodiversity, Conservation and Attractions, meaning that it is poorly known and known from only a few locations but is not under imminent threat.

References

pendula
Rosales of Australia
Flora of Western Australia
Plants described in 2007
Taxa named by Barbara Lynette Rye